Joseph Cyril O'Brien (June 25, 1917 -  September 29, 1984) was a  Harness racing driver, trainer and owner who won the U.S. Trotting Triple Crown in 1955 and would be inducted into both the U.S. Harness Racing Hall of Fame and the Canadian Horse Racing Hall of Fame, as well as Canada's Sports Hall of Fame. Noted for his quiet dignity and diplomacy, he is considered one of the greatest harness horsemen in history.

Racing highlights

The early years
Joe O'Brien was the son of a successful Prince Edward Island farmer. His father was involved in the breeding and racing of Standardbreds and it would become part of Joe's life at an early age. He was just 16 years old when he won his first harness race at a Summerside track. After finishing school, instead of going to veterinary college as his mother wanted, in the fall of 1935 he chose to go to work as a trainer at the farm of William Latta in River Hebert, Nova Scotia. Within a few years Joe O'Brien had become a dominant force in racing in the Maritime Provinces. He led all drivers in wins for five straight years from 1943 through 1947 and at Truro Raceway won a record-shattering 11 races on a single racecard. In 1947 he led all drivers in North America with 128 wins but the United States Trotting Association did not recognize the 44 races he won in the Maritime Provinces and gave him a National ranking of 7th in the USTA standings.

California bound
During 1947 Joe O'Brien headed to Del Mar, California where before long he would be hired to drive and train for the West Coast division of Castleton Farms racing stable owned by Frances Dodge, daughter of John Dodge automobile manufacturing pioneer and co-founder of Dodge Brothers Company. O'Brien would soon gain national recognition when he drove and trained the Castleton pacer Indian Land to victory in the then rich $50,000 Golden West Pace at Hollywood Park Racetrack.

In 1951 O'Brien accepted an offer to take over as head trainer and driver for the S. A. Camp Farms, Inc. in Shafter, California, a small city he would call home for the rest of his life. After just four years with owner Sol Camp, Joe O'Brien had won numerous major races and in 1954 he drove Scott Frost to victory in a time of two minutes flat making him the first two-year-old in the world achieve such a winning time. In 1955 O'Brien and Scott Frost won the Hambletonian Stakes, the Yonkers Trot and the Kentucky Futurity giving him the United States Trotting Triple Crown. In a remarkable three years of racing, Scott Frost would be voted the 1954 United States Two-Year-Old Trotter of the Year and the 1955 and 1956 United States Harness Horse of the Year.

In 1958, again for Sol Camp, O'Brien won the Little Brown Jug with Shadow Wave. He would win that most prestigious race for pacers again in 1973 with Thurman Downing's  Melvin's Woe to go along with another Hambletonian in 1960 with Sol Camp's Blaze Hanover, making it his second win in the most prestigious race for trotters.

In 1969, Joe O'Brien became the first driver in history to have won the Hambletonian and Sweden's Elitloppet. Through 2016, only John Campbell has matched that feat, doing it with Mack Lobell in 1988.

In 1963, Sol Camp retired from racing and sold his stable. Joe O'Brien was hired by J. Elgin Armstrong of the Armstrong Brothers breeding and racing operations near Brampton, Ontario for whom he notably developed the great Armbro Flight, Armbro Nesbit and Armbro Ranger.

Breaking the two-minute barrier worldwide
Competing in the 1960s and 1970s, when a winning time of less two minutes was the paragon of excellence, on October 1, 1971 Joe O'Brien drove Steady Star to a World Record of 1:52 in a time trial at The Red Mile. On May 27, 1973 at Solvalla Racetrack in Sweden, O'Brien produced the first ever sub two-minute mile in the history of European harness racing when he won the second heat of the world-famous Elitloppet with Flower Child. Over a period of nine days at the October 1970 annual Grand Circuit meeting at Lexington, Kentucky's Red Mile, O'Brien beat the two-minute mile clocking a total of 10 times. Even more remarkable, in 1975 he set a World Record by winning 44 sub-two-minute mile races and 32 two-minute mile races.

Fresh Yankee
During his career Joe O'Brien trained and/or drove numerous North American Champions and Hall of Fame Standardbreds. Among them he trained and drove Triple Crown winner Scott Frost, as well as Armbro Flight to three straight Canadian Harness Horse of the Year honors. However, it would be Fresh Yankee that brought him the most worldwide publicity.

A $900 yearling purchase, the brilliant mare became the first North American-bred trotter to earn $1 million. During the four years O'Brien trained Fresh Yankee for owner Duncan MacDonald she was voted the U.S. Harness Horse of the Year in 1970, the U.S. Champion Trotting Mare of the Year four times and the Canadian Horse of the Year in 1970 plus the Canadian Champion Aged Trotter a record setting six times. While regularly racing against male trotters, Fresh Yankee broke track and World Records and in 1967 became the fastest trotting mare in history with a time trial clocking of 1:57.1. Her many wins included the American Trotting Classic twice, the International Trot, the United Nations Trot, Germany's Grand Prix of Bavaria and in Sweden the Elitloppet and the International Elite Trot.

Industry executive & O'Brien Awards program
Joe O'Brien was a member of the Board of Directors of the United States Trotting Association and served as president of the California Breeder's Association.

Joe O'Brien died of cancer at his home in Shafter, California. A few years after his passing Standardbred Canada announced they were considering a new national harness racing award program. Established in 1989, it was named the O'Brien Awards in his honor.

References

Further reading
Gentleman Joe The Story of Harness Driver Joe O'Brien
Author: Marie Hill
Publisher Arco Publishing Company 1975

External links
YouTube video of Scott Frost winning the 1955 Hambletonian
YouTube video - profile of Fresh Yankee's career and the 1970 International Trot

Canadian military personnel of World War II
Canadian harness racing drivers
Canadian harness racing trainers
Canadian Horse Racing Hall of Fame inductees
Canadian emigrants to the United States
American harness racing drivers
American harness racing trainers
United States Harness Racing Hall of Fame inductees
Sportspeople from Prince Edward Island
Sportspeople from California
People from Kern County, California
1917 births
1984 deaths
Deaths from cancer in California